The Australian and International Pilots Association (AIPA) is a trade union and professional association formed in 1981 to represent Qantas and its related companies pilots and flight engineers. The AIPA broke away from the Australian Federation of Air Pilots (AFAP) in the early 1980s. It was formally registered in 1986.

In May 2007 the Australian Industrial Relations Commission ruled that the AIPA could cover pilots employed by Jetstar. This means that coverage of Jetstar pilots is shared between the AFAP and the AIPA.

The AIPA does not view itself as a trade union, but as a "professional Association and federally registered organisation". In late 2006 it decided to rejoin the ACTU.

References

Trade unions in Australia
Aviation in Australia
Airline pilots' trade unions
Trade unions established in 1981
1981 establishments in Australia